Jobs may refer to:

 Job, an activity that people do for regular income gain

People
 Steve Jobs (1955–2011), co-founder and former CEO of Apple Inc 
 Steve Jobs (disambiguation)
 Laurene Powell Jobs (born 1963), widow of Steve Jobs
 Lisa Brennan-Jobs (born 1978), daughter of Steve Jobs

Arts and entertainment
 Dirty Jobs, a 2003 television show hosted by Mike Rowe
 Jobs (film), a 2013 biographical film based on the life of Steve Jobs
 Jobs, a major character from K. A. Applegate's Remnants series
 Jobs, a character in the anime and manga series Eureka Seven
 Final Fantasy character jobs, character classes in the Final Fantasy video game series

Places
 Jobs, Ohio, an unincorporated community
 Jobs Peak, a mountain in California

Other uses
 Job Brothers & Co., Limited, commonly referred to as Jobs, a mercantile empire in Newfoundland
 .jobs, a top-level internet domain
 Jumpstart Our Business Startups Act, a law intended to encourage funding of United States small businesses
 Unix shell, a user interface for Unix operating systems containing built-in commands for managing jobs

See also
 Job (disambiguation)